Loreto Grammar School is located in Trafford. Pupils must sit an entrance exam to enter, and fulfil several other entry criteria. It is part of the worldwide Loreto community, and the Altrincham school was founded by the Sisters of Loreto in 1909. It has also assumed the status of an academy (30 August 2012) and is a specialist school for maths and science.

The school's values are justice, truth, sincerity, freedom, joy, and more recently excellence and internationality.

At the school there are 1050 students and 100 staff members. Loreto is also part of a bigger, worldwide community which was founded by Mary Ward and this consists of over 120 schools and 70,000 students.

The 266 students of the school's sixth form are expected to support the ethos and values of the school and show the ability to follow an academic AS/A2 level course or the International Baccalaureate course.

The school was described in its 2005 Ofsted report as "outstanding with an outstanding sixth form". In its next report in 2008 Ofsted remarked "This is an outstandingly effective school. It has improved substantially since the last inspection and has demonstrated excellent capacity to develop further".

Notable former pupils
 Suzanne Charlton, former BBC weather presenter, daughter of Sir Bobby Charlton
 Jade Clarke, England netball captain 2020, also plays for Surrey Storm netball club
 Antonia Quirke, film critic, TV and radio presenter 
 Anna Scaife, professor of radio astronomy at the University of Manchester, winner of the 2018 Jackson-Gwilt Medal
 Nina Warhurst, BBC Breakfast presenter
 Isabella Neville, Model, daughter of Phil Neville, niece of Gary Neville, sister of Harvey Neville

References

Girls' schools in Greater Manchester
Catholic secondary schools in the Diocese of Shrewsbury
Grammar schools in Trafford
Sisters of Loreto schools
Altrincham
Academies in Trafford
1909 establishments in England
Educational institutions established in 1909